Nuasjärvi is a medium-sized lake in Kainuu region in northern Finland. It is located in Sotkamo and it belongs to the Oulujoki main catchment area. Nuasjärvi is separated from another lake Rehja with strait Rimpilänsalmi. The lake is near the Vuokatti Ski and Golf Center.

The lake is affected by saline mine water originating nearby Talvivaara Terrafame Ni-Zn mine and the benthic ecosystem is deteriorating due to mine pollution

See also
List of lakes in Finland

References

Lakes of Sotkamo